KCLT (104.9 FM, "Force 3 Radio") is a radio station broadcasting an urban adult contemporary music format. Licensed to West Helena, Arkansas, United States, the station is currently owned by West Helena Broadcasters Inc. and features programming from Cumulus Media.

History
The Federal Communications Commission granted the station a construction permit on July 2, 1984. The station was assigned the KCLT call sign on July 23, 1984, and was issued its license to cover on July 10, 1986.

References

External links

CLT
Urban adult contemporary radio stations in the United States
Radio stations established in 1986
1986 establishments in Arkansas